is a Japanese politician of the Liberal Democratic Party, a member of the House of Councillors in the Diet (national legislature). A native of Ōita, Ōita, he joined the Ministry of Home Affairs, upon graduation from the University of Tokyo in 1982. After leaving the ministry in 2006, he was elected the House of Councillors for the first time in 2007. He is affiliated to the revisionist lobby Nippon Kaigi.

References

External links 
  in Japanese.

Members of the House of Councillors (Japan)
Living people
1957 births
People from Ōita (city)
Members of Nippon Kaigi
Liberal Democratic Party (Japan) politicians